The Ledger-Enquirer is a newspaper headquartered in downtown Columbus, Georgia, in the United States.  It was founded in 1828 as the Columbus Enquirer by Mirabeau B. Lamar who later played a pivotal role in the founding of the Republic of Texas and served as its third President.  The newspaper is a two-time recipient of the Pulitzer Prize for Public Service.

History 
In 1874, the Columbus Enquirer, until then a weekly publication, merged with Columbus's first daily newspaper, the Daily Sun, to form the Columbus Enquirer-Sun. The paper was published under this name for many years before eventually reverting to the name Columbus Enquirer.  The paper was purchased by R. W. Page in 1930.  For many years the morning Columbus Enquirer and the afternoon Columbus Ledger, a paper founded in 1886, and also owned by R. W. Page, published a combined Sunday paper known as the Sunday Ledger-Enquirer.  Knight Newspapers acquired the company in 1973, and in 1988 the papers merged the daily edition as well, adopting the name Columbus Ledger-Enquirer.  Knight Ridder was acquired by The McClatchy Company in 2006.

1926 Pulitzer Prize 
The Columbus Enquirer-Sun was awarded the 1926 Pulitzer Prize for Public Service "for the service which it rendered in its brave and energetic fight against the Ku Klux Klan; against the enactment of a law barring the teaching of evolution; against dishonest and incompetent public officials and for justice to the Negro and against lynching."

1955 Pulitzer Prize 
The Columbus Ledger and Sunday Ledger-Enquirer were awarded the 1955 Pulitzer Prize for Public Service for their "complete news coverage and fearless editorial attack on widespread corruption in neighboring Phenix City, Alabama, which were effective in destroying a corrupt and racket-ridden city government. The newspaper exhibited an early awareness of the evils of lax law enforcement before the situation in Phenix City erupted into murder. It covered the whole unfolding story of the final prosecution of the wrong-doers with skill, perception, force and courage."

See also

 Media in Columbus, Georgia
 List of newspapers in Georgia (U.S. state)

References

External links

The McClatchy Company's subsidiary profile of the Ledger-Enquirer
Columbus Enquirer Archive Digital Library of Georgia

Newspapers published in Georgia (U.S. state)
McClatchy publications
Pulitzer Prize-winning newspapers
Mass media in Columbus, Georgia
Pulitzer Prize for Public Service winners